St Anne's Diocesan College is a private girls' boarding school situated in the small town of Hilton (Umgungundlovu District Municipality) in the KwaZulu-Natal Midlands of South Africa.

History 

St Anne's Diocesan College was founded by the Rt Revd William Macrorie, Bishop of Maritzburg and Miss Creswell in 1877 in the Manse Building in Pietermaritz Street in Pietermaritzburg. In 1878 the school was moved to the corner of Loop Street and Pine Street in Pietermartzburg. The move to its current location in the village of Hilton which lies above Pietermaritzburg happened in 1904.

In 1977 the tradition to wear white to the matric ball was started.

Previous lady wardens and headmasters/headmistresses 

 1877-1879 Miss Creswell (1st lady warden)
 1879-1889 Miss Usherwood
 1890-1903 Miss Marianne Browne
 1903-1907 Miss Isabel Drury
 1907-1917 Miss Frances Baines
 1917-1941 Miss Dorothy L. Andrews
 1942-1950 Miss Molliew Kate Stone
 1950-1954 Miss Molly Woods
 1954-1955 Miss Dorothy Beggs (Acting Warden)
 1955-1963 Miss Dorothy McEune
 1964-1968 Miss Joyce Carew
 1969-1972 Miss Margaret E. Beer
 1973-1974 Mrs Sheila Morgan
 1975-1986 Mr Anthony Cheetham
 1987-1997 Mr Bill McQuade
 1998-2009 Mr David Wilkinson
 2010-2020 Mr David Arguile
2021 -        Mrs Debbie Martin

Boarding

There are six boarding houses: 
Andrews, 
Frances Baines, 
Macrorie,
Marianne Browne, 
Mollie Stone and 
Usherwood.

Notable alumni 
 Killie Campbell (1881 - 1965), collector of Africana
 Caro Feely, writer, wine educator, winemaker and organic activist
 Mary Stainbank, sculptor
 Candice Swanepoel, supermodel, Victoria's Secret Angel

See also 

 List of boarding schools

Notes and references

External links 

 

Girls' schools in South Africa
Anglican schools in South Africa
Boarding schools in South Africa
Private schools in KwaZulu-Natal
Educational institutions established in 1877
1877 establishments in the Colony of Natal
Umgungundlovu District Municipality